Dżok ("Jock") was a black mongrel dog who, for the entire year (1990–1991), was seen waiting in vain at the Rondo Grunwaldzkie roundabout in Kraków, Poland, to be fetched back by his master, who had died there. A monument located on the Czerwieński Boulevard on the Vistula River in Kraków, near the Wawel Castle and the Grunwald Bridge.

History 
The history of Dżok is considered by some to be one of the legends of Kraków. He talks about a dog - a black hybrid - whose owner in tragic circumstances died of a heart attack near the Grunwald roundabout. The dog was waiting there for his master. Fed by the inhabitants of Kraków, it aroused surprise and sympathy. After about a year of waiting, he accepted a new owner, Maria Müller (widow of Władysław Müller). The woman died in 1998, the animal escaped and, loitering around the railway area, died under the wheels of a moving train.

Creation of the monument 

Despite the initial lack of favor of the city authorities, many organizations contributed to the creation of the monument (including the Kraków Society for the Care of Animals and nationwide media based in Kraków), well-known people Zbigniew Wodecki, Jerzy Połomski, Krzysztof Cugowski and many inhabitants of Kraków.

The creator of the monument sculpture is Bronisław Chromy. Its unveiling, on May 26, 2001, was made by a dog (a German shepherd named Kety).

A small monument depicts a dog inside spreading human hands, extending his left paw to the viewer. In principle, it symbolizes dog fidelity and, more generally, the bond of an animal with a human being.

The inscription on the monument (in Polish and English) reads:
"The most faithful canine friend ever, epitomizing a dog's boundless devotion to his master. Throughout the entire year / 1990-1991 / Dżok was seen waiting in vain at the roundabout Grunwaldzkie roundabout to be fetched back by his master.

They intended to move the sculpture by several dozen meters because that was the concept of the National Army monument, which was planned to be set up here.

References

Bibliography 
Bujas Agnieszka, Pasek Hanna: Monument for loyalty. "Super Express", 19 V 1998, pp. 1, 6 and 7.
Dżok did not want to live without you. "A moment for You", 9 July 1998, No. 28, pp. 1, 4 and 5.
Terakowska Dorota: Epitaph for the death of a dog. "Przekrój", 3 V 1998, No. 18, pp. 1, 12 and 13.
Korczyńska Jadwiga ( Adelaide ), letter to the editor. "Przekrój", 28 June 1998, No. 26, p. 38.
Terakowska Dorota: Monument to the faithful dog. "Przekrój", 11 IV 1999, No. 15, p. 33.
Kursa Magdalena: Monument to dog fidelity. Gazeta Wyborcza, 24 November 2000, p. 9.
Wacław Krupiński: Writing with Dżok in the background. "Dziennik Polski", 18 June 2007

1990 animal births
1991 animal deaths
Dog monuments
Monuments and memorials in Kraków
2001 sculptures